is a private university in Japan.

The university has two campuses, one in Sakado, Saitama and the other in Komagome, Toshima, Tokyo. The Sakado campus contains all undergraduate and postgraduate courses. The Komagome campus houses the Evening Department, junior college, and vocational college.

History

Kagawa Nutrition University was founded in 1961. In 1965, the university's School of Home Economics was reorganized and renamed the School of Nutrition Sciences.

In 2000, Kagawa Nutrition Junior College was reorganized and renamed the Junior College of Kagawa Nutrition University. In 2001, the Kagawa Nutrition Education Foundation was renamed the Kagawa Education Institute of Nutrition.

Campuses

Sakado campus (Kagawa Nutrition University)
3-9-21 Chiyoda, Sakado, Saitama 350-0288
Coordinates: 
(Nearest station: Wakaba Station)

Komagome campus (Junior College of Kagawa Nutrition University)

3-24-3 Komagome, Toshima-ku, Tokyo 170-8481
Coordinates: 
(Nearest station: Komagome Station)

References

External links
 

Educational institutions established in 1948
Private universities and colleges in Japan
Universities and colleges in Saitama Prefecture
1948 establishments in Japan
Sakado, Saitama
Women's universities and colleges in Japan